Inquisitor spicata is a species of sea snail, a marine gastropod mollusk in the family Pseudomelatomidae.

Description
The length of the shell attains 16 mm, its diameter 5.5 mm.

(Original description) The solid shell has a lanceolate shape and contains 10 whorls. Its colour is uniform dull white.

Sculpture :—Except where interrupted by the spirals, the shell is overrun by very close microscopic radial lamellae, a series of which rise along the suture and curl into arched scales. These crown the summit of each whorl and give a distinct recognition mark to the species. This crest of scales is underlined by a stout undulating cord. Though excavate out of the general contour, the fasciole is not well differentiated. It is sculptured by radial lamellae and traversed by two or three spiral threads. On the body whorl, anterior to the fasciole, run about sixteen rather flat-topped spiral lyrae, about twice their own breadth apart, between which one or two-minute interstitial threads may occur. On the penultimate whorl there are four such spirals .Wave-like ribs are set at about thirteen to a whorl, interrupted by the fasciole, but continuing to the base and ascending the spire perpendicularly.

Aperture :—The mouth is narrow. The siphonal canal is short and wide. The sinus is deeply U-shaped. The margin is everted. Behind the aperture is a varical swelling, followed by a narrow pocket groove, beyond which again the outer lip is turned inwards, giving rise to a short free edge. The callus on the columella is a thick sheet, the anterior edge of which is free from the preceding whorl.

Distribution
This marine species is endemic to Australia and occurs off Northern Territory, Queensland and Western Australia.

References

 Hinds, R.B. 1843. Description of new shells from the collection of Captain Belcher. Annals and Magazine of Natural History ser. 1 11: 16–21, 36–46, 255–257
 Brazier, J. 1876. A list of the Pleurotomidae collected during the Chevert Expedition, with the description of the new species. Proceedings of the Linnean Society of New South Wales 1: 151–162
 Odhner, N.H. 1917. Results of Dr E. Mjöbergs Swedish scientific expeditions to Australia. 1910–1913, pt XVII, Mollusca. Kongliga Svenska Vetenskaps-Academiens Nya Handlingar, Stockholm 52(16): 1–115 pls 1–3 
  Hedley, C. 1922. A revision of the Australian Turridae. Records of the Australian Museum 13(6): 213–359, pls 42–56
 Wells, F.E. 1994. A revision of the Recent Australian species of the turrid genera Inquisitor and Ptychobela. Journal of the Malacological Society of Australasia 15: 71–102

External links
 
 Brazier, J. 1876. A list of the Pleurotomidae collected during the Chevert expedition, with the description of the new species. Proceedings of the Linnean Society of New South Wales 1: 151–162
 Gastropods.com: Inquisitor spicata

spicata
Gastropods of Australia
Gastropods described in 1843